Vidya Malvade (born 2 March 1973) is an Indian actress.

Early life
Malvade was born on 2 March 1973 in Maharashtra, India. She has 2 younger sisters.

Career
Vidya started her career as an air hostess. She then began modelling and was chosen by ad filmmaker Prahlad Kakkar for some advertisements. Her acting debut was with Vikram Bhatt's Inteha (2003) which failed at the box office. After a string of unsuccessful movies and several advertisements, she acted in Chak De India in the year 2007 playing the role of a goalie and captain of the Indian women's national hockey team. Her most recent movie was Yaara Silly Silly.

Personal life
Vidya studied Law and worked as an Air Hostess. Her first husband, Capt. Arvind Singh Bagga, was a pilot with Alliance Air. He died in 2000 when his flight, Alliance Air Flight 7412, crashed into a building in Patna. In 2009, she married Sanjay Dayma, who worked with Ashutosh Gowariker on the Oscar award-nominated Lagaan as the film's Screenplay Writer and Associate Director.

Filmography

Film

Television

Web series

Awards and nominations

References

External links

 
 
Chak De India Biography
Interview with Bollyspice.com

1973 births
Living people
Indian film actresses
Actresses in Hindi cinema
Female models from Mumbai
21st-century Indian actresses
Actresses from Mumbai
Fear Factor: Khatron Ke Khiladi participants